Akkol is a village in Zerendi District, Akmola Region, in northern part of Kazakhstan. The KATO code is 115633100.

Demographics

Population 
Population:  (546 males and 575 females). As of 2009, the population of Akkol was 1140 inhabitants (547 males and 593 females).

References

Notes

Populated places in Akmola Region